Brielle is a borough located in southern Monmouth County, in the U.S. state of New Jersey, along the Manasquan River. As of the 2020 United States census, the borough's population was 4,982, its highest decennial count ever and an increase of 208 (+4.4%) from the 4,774 enumerated at the 2010 census, which reflected a decline of 119 (−2.4%) from the 4,893 counted at the 2000 census.

Brielle was formed as a borough by an act of the New Jersey Legislature on April 10, 1919, from portions of Wall and Township, based on the results of a referendum passed on June 3, 1919. The borough was named after Brielle, Netherlands.

History
Archaeological excavations along what is now Birch Drive reveal temporary Lenape Native American settlements. The Lenape practiced farming in other parts of Monmouth County much of the year, and they visited the wooded areas in what is now Brielle for hunting and fishing.

The area was originally part of Shrewsbury Township and the first settlers were primarily farmers, and the area became known as Union Landing. In colonial times, salt was an important preservative, and before the American Revolutionary War, most of it was imported from Great Britain. The Union Salt Works opened around the outbreak of the war, and on April 5, 1778, several British Loyalists attacked and burned the salt works and other buildings. A year later, the salt works reopened and continued to operate through the duration of the war.

Early in the 19th century, Shrewsbury Township was divided, and the area became part of Howell Township which was further divided in 1851, when the area became part of Wall Township. On July 7, 1881, a group of businessmen purchased several acres of land and formed the Brielle Land Association with the intention of building vacation homes. The quaint riverside charm of the area reminded one of the developers of another pastoral town on a river which he had visited, Brielle, in the Netherlands.

Author Robert Louis Stevenson vacationed in Brielle for most of May 1888. During his stay he wrote a portion of his book The Master of Ballantrae and gave Osborn Island the nickname "Treasure Island" which was the title of one of his previous books.

Geography

According to the United States Census Bureau, the borough had a total area of 2.37 square miles (6.14 km2), including 1.76 square miles (4.55 km2) of land and 0.61 square miles (1.59 km2) of water (25.86%).

Located at the southeastern corner of Monmouth County, Brielle is bordered to the north and east by the Manasquan, to the west by Brick Township (in Ocean County) and Wall Township and to the south by Point Pleasant and Point Pleasant Beach across the Manasquan River. Route 35 runs through the middle of the town and Route 70 runs along its western edge.

The borough is primarily a residential community of single homes, with a few condominiums; there are almost no undeveloped lots of land left. There are several businesses located along Union Avenue and Higgins Avenue and some marinas along the Manasquan River. Ripley's Believe It or Not! once stated that Brielle has "16 bars and no churches". It currently has one church, The Church in Brielle (formerly the Dutch Reformed Church) and several restaurants that have liquor licenses, but no full bars. There is also a  18 hole golf course called the Manasquan River Golf Club.

Brielle's borders extend to an  island in the Manasquan River.

Manasquan Park is an unincorporated community located within Brielle.

Demographics

Census 2010

The Census Bureau's 2006–2010 American Community Survey showed that (in 2010 inflation-adjusted dollars) median household income was $98,419 (with a margin of error of +/− $10,635) and the median family income was $108,818 (+/− $11,831). Males had a median income of $84,568 (+/− $8,259) versus $53,041 (+/− $4,411) for females. The per capita income for the borough was $45,445 (+/− $5,694). About none of families and 3.7% of the population were below the poverty line, including none of those under age 18 and 2.9% of those age 65 or over.

Census 2000
As of the 2000 United States census there were 4,893 people, 1,938 households, and 1,414 families residing in the borough. The population density was 2,754.4 people per square mile (1,061.3/km2). There were 2,123 housing units at an average density of 1,195.1 per square mile (460.5/km2). The racial makeup of the borough was 93.05% White, 3.52% African American, 0.06% Native American, 0.67% Asian, 1.61% from other races, and 1.08% from two or more races. Hispanic or Latino of any race were 3.31% of the population.

There were 1,938 households, out of which 30.8% had children under the age of 18 living with them, 62.0% were married couples living together, 7.6% had a female householder with no husband present, and 27.0% were non-families. 23.5% of all households were made up of individuals, and 12.0% had someone living alone who was 65 years of age or older. The average household size was 2.52 and the average family size was 3.00.

In the borough the population was spread out, with 23.7% under the age of 18, 4.8% from 18 to 24, 24.8% from 25 to 44, 29.0% from 45 to 64, and 17.7% who were 65 years of age or older. The median age was 43 years. For every 100 females, there were 91.4 males. For every 100 females age 18 and over, there were 89.8 males.

The median income for a household in the borough was $178,368, and the median income for a family was $172,867. Males had a median income of $98,828 versus $72,156 for females. The per capita income for the borough was $105,785. About 2.6% of families and 3.9% of the population were below the poverty line, including 1.9% of those under age 18 and 5.4% of those age 65 or over.

Government

Local government

Brielle is governed under the Borough form of New Jersey municipal government, which is used in 218 (of the 564) municipalities statewide, making it the most common form of government in New Jersey. The governing body is comprised of a Mayor and a Borough Council, with all positions elected at-large on a partisan basis as part of the November general election. A Mayor is elected directly by the voters to a four-year term of office. The Borough Council is comprised of six members elected to serve three-year terms on a staggered basis, with two seats coming up for election each year in a three-year cycle. The Borough form of government used by Brielle is a "weak mayor / strong council" government in which council members act as the legislative body with the mayor presiding at meetings and voting only in the event of a tie. The mayor can veto ordinances subject to an override by a two-thirds majority vote of the council. The mayor makes committee and liaison assignments for council members, and most appointments are made by the mayor with the advice and consent of the council.

, the Mayor of the Borough of Brielle is Republican Thomas B. Nicol, whose term of office ends December 31, 2023. Members of the Brielle Borough Council are Frank A. Garruzzo (R, 2024), Michael A. Gianforte (R, 2022), Cort W. Gorham (R, 2022), Paul K. Nolan (R, 2024), Timothy A. Shaak (R, 2023) and John V. Visceglia (R, 2023).

Federal, state, and county representation
Brielle is located in the 4th Congressional District and is part of New Jersey's 30th state legislative district. Prior to the 2011 reapportionment following the 2010 Census, Brielle had been in the 11th state legislative district.

 

Monmouth County is governed by a Board of County Commissioners comprised of five members who are elected at-large to serve three year terms of office on a staggered basis, with either one or two seats up for election each year as part of the November general election. At an annual reorganization meeting held in the beginning of January, the board selects one of its members to serve as Director and another as Deputy Director. , Monmouth County's Commissioners are
Commissioner Director Thomas A. Arnone (R, Neptune City, term as commissioner and as director ends December 31, 2022), 
Commissioner Deputy Director Susan M. Kiley (R, Hazlet Township, term as commissioner ends December 31, 2024; term as deputy commissioner director ends 2022),
Lillian G. Burry (R, Colts Neck Township, 2023),
Nick DiRocco (R, Wall Township, 2022), and 
Ross F. Licitra (R, Marlboro Township, 2023). 
Constitutional officers elected on a countywide basis are
County clerk Christine Giordano Hanlon (R, 2025; Ocean Township), 
Sheriff Shaun Golden (R, 2022; Howell Township) and 
Surrogate Rosemarie D. Peters (R, 2026; Middletown Township).

Politics

As of March 23, 2011, there were a total of 3,653 registered voters in Brielle, of which 617 (16.9%) were registered as Democrats, 1,446 (39.6%) were registered as Republicans and 1,590 (43.5%) were registered as Unaffiliated. There were no voters registered to other parties.

In the 2012 presidential election, Republican Mitt Romney received 66.7% of the vote (1,893 cast), ahead of Democrat Barack Obama with 32.2% (914 votes), and other candidates with 1.0% (29 votes), among the 2,859 ballots cast by the borough's 3,830 registered voters (23 ballots were spoiled), for a turnout of 74.6%. In the 2008 presidential election, Republican John McCain received 61.3% of the vote (1,842 cast), ahead of Democrat Barack Obama with 36.1% (1,085 votes) and other candidates with 1.3% (40 votes), among the 3,003 ballots cast by the borough's 3,824 registered voters, for a turnout of 78.5%. In the 2004 presidential election, Republican George W. Bush received 67.5% of the vote (1,971 ballots cast), outpolling Democrat John Kerry with 31.3% (913 votes) and other candidates with 0.5% (18 votes), among the 2,918 ballots cast by the borough's 3,805 registered voters, for a turnout percentage of 76.7.

In the 2013 gubernatorial election, Republican Chris Christie received 79.1% of the vote (1,533 cast), ahead of Democrat Barbara Buono with 19.4% (376 votes), and other candidates with 1.5% (30 votes), among the 1,963 ballots cast by the borough's 3,852 registered voters (24 ballots were spoiled), for a turnout of 51.0%. In the 2009 gubernatorial election, Republican Chris Christie received 70.9% of the vote (1,571 ballots cast), ahead of Democrat Jon Corzine with 22.2% (491 votes), Independent Chris Daggett with 5.8% (129 votes) and other candidates with 0.6% (13 votes), among the 2,215 ballots cast by the borough's 3,664 registered voters, yielding a 60.5% turnout.

Education

The Brielle School District serves public school students in pre-kindergarten through eighth grade at Brielle Elementary School. As of the 2020–21 school year, the district, comprised of one school, had an enrollment of 512 students and 50.6 classroom teachers (on an FTE basis), for a student–teacher ratio of 10.1:1.

For ninth through twelfth grades, public school students attend Manasquan High School in Manasquan, as part of a sending/receiving relationship with the Manasquan Public Schools, joining students from Avon-by-the-Sea, Belmar, Lake Como, Sea Girt, Spring Lake and Spring Lake Heights at the school. As of the 2020–21 school year, the high school had an enrollment of 1,006 students and 76.9 classroom teachers (on an FTE basis), for a student–teacher ratio of 13.1:1.

The Brielle Public Library, which is located at 610 South Street, claims to have been the first library in New Jersey to have offered public access to the Internet.

Transportation

Roads and highways

New Jersey Route 35 is the main highway serving Brielle. Brielle is also the southern terminus of New Jersey Route 71. A small portion of New Jersey Route 70 also passes through the borough.

Public transportation
NJ Transit provides bus transportation between the borough and Philadelphia on the 317 route and local service on the 830 route.

NJ Transit's North Jersey Coast Line travels through Brielle, but does not stop in the borough. The nearest station is the Manasquan station.

Notable people

People who were born in, residents of, or otherwise closely associated with Brielle include:

 Robert E. Brennan (born 1944), businessman who built the penny stock brokerage firm, First Jersey Securities
 Charles H. Brower (1901–1984), advertising executive, copywriter and author
 Jeffrey A. Citron (born ), chairman of Vonage, a voice-over-IP phone company, inventor of Island ECN and founder of Datek
 Mary Catherine Cuff (born 1947), former acting justice of the New Jersey Supreme Court (Judge of the Appellate Division, Temporarily Assigned to the Supreme Court) who served between 2012 and 2016
 Edward A. Flynn (born ), law enforcement official who has been Chief of the Milwaukee Police Department
 Ben Kenney (born 1977), bass guitarist for the band Incubus
 Gerry Matthews (born 1941), head men's basketball coach at Stockton University
 Riley McCusker (born 2001), artistic gymnast and 2018 World Champion
 Frank Mundus (1925–2008), shark hunter said to have inspired the character Quint in the movie Jaws
 Charles Piercey (1890–1966), Australian racing cyclist
 Nelson Rae (1915–1945), radio and stage actor killed during World War II
 Mark Tornillo (born 1954), singer and vocalist of heavy metal band Accept
 Jason Westrol (born 1988), professional basketball player who has played for the Limburg United of the Belgian Basketball League

References

External links

Borough of Brielle website
Brielle Elementary School

School Data for the Brielle Elementary School, National Center for Education Statistics
Brielle Police Department
Brielle Chamber of Commerce
Union Landing Historical Society – Brielle's History

 
1919 establishments in New Jersey
Archaeological sites in New Jersey
Borough form of New Jersey government
Boroughs in Monmouth County, New Jersey
Populated places established in 1919